Celebrity Big Brother 12 was the twelfth series of the British reality television series Celebrity Big Brother. It launched on 22 August 2013, three days after the fourteenth regular series final, in two parts. The series ended after 23 days on 13 September 2013, with Charlotte Crosby being voted the winner of the series by the public. It continued to air on Channel 5 as part of a two-year contract with Endemol, which secured the show until 2014. It was the fifth celebrity series to air on Channel 5 and the eighth series of Big Brother to air on the broadcaster overall since they acquired the show.

This was the first celebrity edition to be hosted by Emma Willis. Willis continued to host ...Bit on the Side, alongside Rylan Clark and AJ Odudu.

Pre-series

Logo
The official new eye logo for the series was released on 1 August 2013. The new logo design followed the same pattern as for Big Brother 14, but with a new golden theme. The new icon featured the doors, drawers and wooden frame of the fourteenth civilian series' eye – but it was recoloured in gold and navy blue to give it a VIP feel to tie in with the 'posh' theme of the series. Unlike most Celebrity Big Brother eyes, this logo did not feature the "star" in the centre.

Presenters
On 2 April 2013, Emma Willis was officially announced as the host of Celebrity Big Brother, after previous host Brian Dowling was removed. Willis also presented Celebrity Big Brother's Bit on the Side alongside Rylan Clark and AJ Odudu, who replaced Alice Levine and Jamie East from the fourteenth regular series.

Sponsorship
The series sponsor was casino website and television programme (that airs nightly on Channel 5) SuperCasino.

Teasers
From 16 August 2013, Channel 5 began screening a ten-second trailer celebrating the return of the series. The trailer featured the obligatory voiceover of Marcus Bentley, and showcased the newest Celebrity Big Brother logo.

House
Pictures of the house were released on 22 August 2013. The house contained a 'posh' theme, with luxurious fittings in and outside of the Celebrity Big Brother compound. This was in stark contrast to the eco-style house that was in use just three days before in the fourteenth regular series.

Housemates
All housemates entered the show on Day 1.

Abz Love
Richard Abidin Breen, better known as Abz Love or simply Abz, is an English singer, rapper, dancer, record producer and DJ. He has sold over 20 million records as a member and lead singer of boy band Five. He also released his debut studio album, Abstract Theory in 2003, which earned him a further three top ten hits. Abz entered the house on Day 1. Whilst in the house, he spoke in the Diary Room of his difficulty in social situations, and revealed that he has Asperger syndrome. On Day 23, Abz left in second place, losing to Charlotte Crosby.

Bruce Jones
Bruce Jones (born Ian Roy Jones) is an English actor who is known best for playing Les Battersby in Coronation Street. He entered the house on Day 1. Bruce was evicted on Day 16.

Carol McGiffin
Carol McGiffin is an English television and radio broadcaster, best known for her regular appearances on daytime talk show Loose Women. Her style then and characterized today is based on comedic observation on men. She entered the House on Day 1. On Day 23, Carol finished in fourth place. After appearing on the series, she was a regular panelist on the spin-off show Celebrity Big Brother... Bit on the Psych during the future thirteenth series.

Charlotte Crosby
Charlotte Crosby is an English reality television personality, who rose to fame as a cast member in the MTV reality series, Geordie Shore from series 1 onwards. She is also known for her on-again off-again relationship with co-star Gaz Beadle. She entered the House on Day 1. On Day 23, Crosby was crowned the winner of the series, beating Abz Love.

Courtney Stodden
Courtney Alexis Stodden, (born 29 August 1994), is an American tabloid personality. They made headlines with their marriage to Green Mile actor Doug Hutchison in 2011, when he was 51 and they were just 16. They entered the house on Day 1 and left on Day 21, two days before the final night.

Danielle Marr
Danielle Marr, also known as Danielle Meagher, (born 1979/80) is an Irish celebrity botox doctor and television personality, who rose to fame through being one of the main cast members on the former reality series Dublin Wives on TV3. She was described as being the 'alpha-female' amongst the other housewives in the show, with her strong wills, opinions and one-liners. Qualified as a graduate dentist, she became the clinical director for DermaFACE, a botox clinic based in Dublin. On Day 1, she entered the house. On Day 7, she was the first celebrity to be evicted, having received the fewest public votes to save.

Dustin Diamond
Dustin Neil Diamond, (born 7 January 1977, died 1 February 2021), was an American actor, musician, director, and stand-up comedian best known for his role as Samuel "Screech" Powers in the television show Saved by the Bell. He entered the house on Day 1 and was evicted on Day 16.

Lauren Harries
Lauren Harries (born James Charles Harries) is a British media personality. In childhood, Harries was known as James, a purported "child prodigy" in the field of antiques who made appearances on television programmes including Wogan. 

She later decided to transition from male to female after displaying feminine mannerisms, and had carried out sex reassignment surgery in 2001.

On Day 1, Lauren entered the House, and was selected out of the first three housemates to join the Temple. On Day 23, Lauren exited into third place.

Louie Spence
Louie Spence, (born 6 April 1969), is an English dance expert, choreographer and television personality best known as the artistic director at the Pineapple Dance Studios. He entered the house and then The Temple on Day 1. Louie was evicted on Day 21, following fellow housemate Courtney.

Mario Falcone
Mario Falcone is a British reality television personality, best known for starring in the ITV2 semi-reality programme The Only Way Is Essex from the third series onwards. Since then, he has become known for his on-again off-again relationship with cast member Lucy Mecklenburgh. He entered the House on Day 1. Mario was evicted in fifth place, and left the house with Vicky Entwistle.

Ron Atkinson
Ronald Frederick "Ron" Atkinson, (born 18 March 1939), is an English former football player and manager. He became manager to a series of successful football teams such as Sheffield Wednesday, Nottingham Forest, Aston Villa and Manchester United over the course of his career. Atkinson has become one of Britain's best-known football pundits, and his idiosyncratic turn of phrase has led to his utterances becoming known as "Big-Ronisms" or "Ronglish". He entered the house on Day 1 but was evicted on Day 9 after receiving the fewest votes to save from the public.

Sophie Anderton
Sophie Louise Anderton is an English model and reality television personality. She entered the house and then The Temple on Day 1. She was evicted on Day 14 having received the fewest votes to save.

Vicky Entwistle
Victoria "Vicky" Entwistle (born 15 September 1968) is an English actress who is famous for playing Janice Battersby in Coronation Street. She entered the house on Day 1 and left in sixth place on Day 23.

Cult of Celebrity
On launch night, it was revealed that there was a place adjacent to the Diary Room known as 'The Temple.' Later, Lauren, Louie and Sophie were chosen by Big Brother to become cult celebrities who would live in The Temple in secret, away from the rest of the housemates. It was then announced that they would have the power to nominate three housemates of their choice to face the first public vote.

Note:  The cult celebrities, after putting forward their recommendations as to which housemate should be nominated, decided to nominate this housemate to face the first public vote.

Summary

Nominations table

Notes

Ratings
Official ratings are taken from BARB and include Channel 5 +1.

Controversy
On Day 2, Carol McGiffin received a formal warning from Big Brother after using the word "nigger" in a conversation with Louie Spence. The warning attracted some criticism from viewers as Carol was quoting what Ron Atkinson had said during his time as a football pundit. Viewers were also critical of the fact that "nigger" was censored when Carol used it in said conversation with Louie, but when Big Brother referenced it when speaking to her, it was left uncensored.

On Day 3, Ron was given a formal warning by Big Brother after he commented to Danielle Marr, "You're not carrying a bomb with you, are you?" while she had her jumper over her head in similar fashion to a headscarf, which is commonly worn by Muslim women. Ron was then called to the Diary Room where Big Brother told him that his comments could be deemed "potentially offensive".

On Day 5, Mario Falcone was called to the Diary Room and given an official warning by Big Brother after "slapping" Sophie Anderton while playfighting in the garden.

On Day 8, Lauren Harries was given a formal warning by Big Brother after she attempted to share some of her medication with Courtney Stodden. Lauren put some of her tablets in Courtney's mouth and told her to have a drink after Courtney complained about feeling unwell.

References

External links
 Official website
 Official Celebrity Big Brother page
 

2013 in British television
2013 British television seasons
12
Channel 5 (British TV channel) reality television shows